Luke Burgess may refer to:
Luke Burgess (footballer) (born 1999), English association football player
Luke Burgess (rugby league) (born 1987), English rugby league player
Luke Burgess (rugby union) (born 1983), Australian rugby union player